King & Prince is a five-member Japanese idol group under Johnny & Associates that debuted in 2018. The group was originally a Johnny's Jr. unit, Mr. King vs Mr. Prince that was composed of 2 separate units: Mr. King and Prince. The units later performed as one group for TV Asahi's Roppongi Hills Natsu Matsuri Summer Station in June 2015. Their debut was announced at a press conference on 17 January 2018 along with the establishment of Johnny & Associates' new record label under Universal Music, Johnny's Universe, with King & Prince becoming the first artists to sign under the label. They have sold 12.3 million physical copies in Japan.

The group used to have six members: Sho Hirano, Ren Nagase, Kaito Takahashi, Yuta Kishi, Yuta Jinguji and Genki Iwahashi. However, Genki Iwahashi withdrew from King & Prince and Johnny & Associates on 31 March 2021 due to anxiety disorder.

On November 4 2022, it was revealed that three of the five members would be leaving the group on May 22 2023; Sho Hirano and Yuta Jinguji are to leave the agency on the same day, while Yuta Kishi will leave the agency during the fall of 2023.

History

2015–2017: Beginnings
Johnny & Associates announced the group's formation in a press conference on 5 June 2015. The group was formed to be special supporters for TV Asahi's Summer Station event. Mr. King vs Mr. Prince was divided into two subgroups: "Mr. King", consisting of Sho Hirano, Ren Nagase, and Kaito Takahashi and "Mr. Prince", consisting of Yuta Kishi, Yuta Jinguji, and Genki Iwahashi. Producer Johnny Kitagawa chose their name in hopes that each member would "spark off each other" and "improve themselves through friendly rivalry". The group's first original song, "Summer Station" was used as the official theme song for the Summer Station event, which ran from July to August 2015. The group was meant to disband after the event. However, in August 2015, the members announced that they would continue activities as a group.

By 2016, Mr. Prince had changed their name to "Prince" and the six members predominately worked within their respective units. Mr. King released a photo book and were special supporters for Summer Station 2016, while Prince performed in the Johnny's Ginza musical and started to host their own variety show, Mayonaka no Prince. In September 2017, the six members performed in the Johnny's Jr. concert Summer Sta (Kimi ga) King's Treasure. After the concert, they asked Johnny Kitagawa to let them debut together.

2018–present: Debut and success
On 17 January 2018, their debut was announced in a press conference, along with the establishment of Johnny & Associates' new record label under Universal Music, Johnny's Universe, with King & Prince becoming the first artists to sign under the label. Their debut single "Cinderella Girl" was released on 23 May 2018. It was used as the theme song for the drama Boys Over Flowers Season 2 which stars member Sho Hirano. "Cinderella Girl" was a commercial success; it sold over 577,000 copies in its first week, making it the first debut single in over 12 years to exceed initial sales of 500,000 copies. This also made it the most commercially successful debut of the decade. By late June King & Prince had become the highest earning new artist, with a total gross of ¥870,000,000. In September 2018, "Cinderella Girl" was certified 3× Platinum by the Recording Industry Association of Japan (RIAJ) for shipments of 750,000 units.

Following the success of "Cinderella Girl", King & Prince embarked on a nationwide arena tour titled King & Prince First Concert Tour 2018. The tour began in August at the Yokohama Arena with a sold-out show to 15,000 guests. When the tour concluded, the audience totaled about 260,000 fans. On 10 October 2018, King & Prince released their second single titled "Memorial". The single was used as the theme song for the television drama Bukatsu, Suki Janakya Dame Desu ka? starring members Kaito Takahashi, Yuta Jinguji, and Genki Iwahashi. Another song included in the single, "High On Love", was used as the theme song for the film You, I Love which stars member Hirano. "Memorial" sold more than 400,000 copies in its first week, and topped the Oricon Singles Chart. In the same month of release, it was certified 2× Platinum by the RIAJ for shipments of 500,000 units.

In November 2018, Genki Iwahashi went on hiatus indefinitely to concentrate on treatment for his panic disorder. The group's management announced in February 2019 that he would rejoin the group and participate on their third single, "Kimi wo Matteru", but in March it was noted that he was to continue receiving treatment.
On March 31, 2021, Genki Iwahashi officially left King & Prince and retired from the entertainment industry.

On 23 May 2021, the third anniversary of their CD debut, King & Prince official Twitter and Instagram accounts, YouTube channel were opened at 5:23 am. Starting with their first single "Cinderella Girl" and music videos for the singles released in the past were shown on a daily basis until the same day on Youtube. The first terrestrial tv program " King & Prince Ru. " has started since 30 May 2021. When the first instagram live was held, they announced the release of their third album and a tour with over 400,000 people watching.

From 21 to 22 August, they served as the main personality on "24 Hour TV Love Will Save the Earth" which was broadcast live on Nippon Television Network Corporation.

In December, It ranked third (873,000) in the ranking of 2021 YouTube new channel subscribers in Japan.

On 1 January 2022, their crown program " King & Prince Ru. " was aired as a New Year's Day special on a nationwide network, and regular broadcasts began on 16 January.

From 2 April, they embarked on their first 4-dome tour " King & Prince First DOME TOUR 2022 - Mr. ".

On November 4, 2022 it was reported that Yuta Kishi, Yuta Jinguji and Sho Hirano would be leaving the group in May 22 2023, and the agency, that day for Hirano and Jinguji, and in Autumn for Kishi. The two remaining members will continue with the group's name.

Members

Current
 Sho Hirano
 Ren Nagase
 Kaito Takahashi
 Yuta Kishi
 Yuta Jinguji

Former

 Genki Iwahashi (left on March 31, 2021)

Discography

Albums

Studio albums

Video albums

Singles

Other songs

Awards and nominations

References

External links
Official website 

Japanese boy bands
Japanese idol groups
Japanese dance groups
Japanese musical groups
Johnny & Associates
Musical groups established in 2018
Universal Music Japan artists
2018 establishments in Japan